Scandal in Sorrento (original title Pane, amore e...) is a 1955 Italian  comedy film directed by Dino Risi. This is the third film of the trilogy, formed by Bread, Love and Dreams in 1953, Bread, Love and Jealousy in 1954. Innovations include the use of color rather than black and white, as well the location of Sorrento instead of the small village of the previous films of the series. At the 6th Berlin International Film Festival it won the Honorable Mention (Best Humorous Film) award.

Plot
In this Italian romantic comedy set in the beautiful Bay of Naples, Marshal Antonio Carotenuto arrives back in his home town of Sorrento to take care of the local municipal police.  Donna Sofia, an attractive fishmonger, has rented the home from the marshal who wants to reclaim his home. The woman refuses to leave but almost accepts marriage to Antonio almost as a joke to make Nicolino, a fisherman who she is genuinely in love with, jealous. She goes along with the marshal's courting, agrees to dump her fiancé and says she will marry him. When the marshal realizes what she is doing, he breaks up with her and decides to pursue his own landlady instead.

Cast
 Vittorio De Sica as Maresciallo Carotenuto
 Sophia Loren as Donna Sofia, a Smargiassa
 Lea Padovani as Donna Violante Ruotolo
 Antonio Cifariello as Nicola Pascazio, Nicolino
 Tina Pica as Caramella
 Mario Carotenuto as Don Matteo Carotenuto
 Virgilio Riento as Don Emidio

References

External links 
 

1955 films
Films set in Italy
1950s Italian-language films
1955 romantic comedy films
Films directed by Dino Risi
Titanus films
Films set in Campania
Films set in Sorrento
Italian romantic comedy films
Films scored by Alessandro Cicognini
1950s Italian films